The Multi-function Agile Remote-Controlled Robot (MARCbot) is a military robot created by Exponent Inc. for the United States Army Rapid Equipping Force.

Design 
The MARCbot was designed as a low cost robotic platform used in Iraq for the inspection of suspicious objects. Until its creation when US Army patrols encountered a potential improvised explosive device, they had to either wait for a specialist explosive ordnance disposal team with its specialist / expensive robots, or investigate the suspicious package themselves. Exponent worked with the Rapid Equipping Force to create a low cost robot for patrol units. Over 1000 MARCbots were eventually created for the US Army for the Iraq War and the War in Afghanistan. The MARCbot reputedly costs $19,000 - however this is less than other contemporary military robots.

The MARCbot is one of smallest and most commonly used robots in Iraq and looks like a small toy truck with an elevated mast on which a camera is mounted. This camera is used to look, for example, behind doors or through windows without placing human soldiers in danger. It is capable of running for 6 hours on a set of fully charged batteries and was developed with the input of soldiers in Iraq to meet their needs.

Use as an offensive weapon 
The MARCbot was the first ground robot to draw blood in Iraq. One unit jury-rigged a Claymore antipersonnel mine on their units. If they suspected an ambush they would send the robot ahead. If an insurgent was seen the Claymore would be detonated.

See also 
 Military robot
 Goliath tracked mine

References 

Military robots
Unmanned ground vehicles
Unmanned ground combat vehicles
Military vehicles introduced in the 2000s